The Imus Institute of Science and Technology is a private, non-sectarian, co-educational secondary and higher education institution in the city of Imus, province of Cavite, Philippines. It was founded in 2016 as a secondary school. It established its College Department in 2016.

Secondary education
Imus Institute currently offers three high school curricula: Business, Science, and Senior High School.

The Business High School Curriculum complies with the Basic Education Curriculum of the Department of Education. It integrates Information Technology and Entrepreneurship as part of the course.

The Science High School Curriculum is geared more towards students who wants to pursue Engineering or Science education at the college level.

Senior High School Curriculum give adults an opportunity to complete a high school diploma.

Image gallery

References

External links

Official website
Imus Institute Library

Schools in Cavite
Education in Imus